Ruská is a village and municipality in Michalovce District in the Košice Region of eastern Slovakia.

History
In historical records the village was first mentioned in 1195. This makes it one of the oldest recorded villages in not only Michalovce District but in the entire Košice Region.

Geography
The village lies at an elevation of 109 metres and covers an area of 11.905 km².
It has a population of about 595 people.

Ethnicity
The population is about 94% Hungarian in ethnicity (547 inhabitants out of 584, according to 2001 census).

Famous people
Here is buried the famous Hungarian captain of Eger struggling against the Ottoman empire, István Dobó.

Culture
The village has a small public library and an association football pitch.

External links

 http://www.statistics.sk/mosmis/eng/run.html

Villages and municipalities in Michalovce District